= Tim Morehouse (politician) =

American politician

Member of the New Hampshire House of Representatives from the Hillsborough 30th district
- Incumbent
- Assumed office December 2026

Personal details
- Party: Republican

Tim Morehouse is an American politician. A member of the Republican Party, he is the member-elect for the Hillsborough 30th district of the New Hampshire House of Representatives. He is scheduled to take office on 2 December 2026.

== Early life and career ==
Morehouse lives in Antrim, New Hampshire. He worked in the hospitality, industrial and retail sectors before retiring in 2018. He has served as a volunteer firefighter and youth soccer coach, and as a cemetery trustee, park and recreation commissioner, town treasurer and library trustee in Antrim; he is president of the Antrim-Bennington Lions Club.

== Personal life ==
Morehouse is married to Linda; they have three daughters, all in the medical field. He was 74 years old in September 2026.

== Elections ==
Morehouse was elected to the New Hampshire House of Representatives in the general election on 3 November 2026, winning one of three seats in the Hillsborough 30th district, which covers Antrim, Bennington, Hillsborough and Windsor. He received 2,127 votes (17.2%). The other two seats went to Democrats McEwen (2,211 votes) and Allen (2,063 votes); Republicans Cottle (2,030) and Baker (1,991) and Democrat Bryk (1,948) were not elected. The last seat was decided by 33 votes. Morehouse won the Republican primary on 8 September 2026, along with Larry Baker and Austin Cottle.

== Political positions ==
Morehouse signed the U.S. Term Limits pledge in support of congressional term limits. His campaign platform included defending freedoms and parental rights, keeping New Hampshire free of sales and income taxes, and supporting solid education with fiscally responsible school administrative units.
